Giuseppina Bersani (27 August 1949 – 3 February 2023) was an Italian fencer. She competed in the women's team foil event at the 1972 Summer Olympics.

Bersani died in Piacenza on 3 February 2023, at the age of 73.

References

External links
 

1949 births
2023 deaths
20th-century Italian women
21st-century Italian women
Fencers at the 1972 Summer Olympics
Italian female fencers
Olympic fencers of Italy